Gustavus Adolphus (9 December [N.S 19 December] 15946 November [N.S 16 November] 1632), also known in English as Gustav II Adolf or Gustav II Adolph, was King of Sweden from 1611 to 1632, and is credited with the rise of Sweden as a great European power. During his reign, Sweden became one of the primary military forces in Europe during the Thirty Years' War, helping to determine the political and religious balance of power in Europe. He was formally and posthumously given the name Gustavus Adolphus the Great by the Riksdag of the Estates in 1634.

He is often regarded as one of the greatest military commanders in modern history, with use of an early form of combined arms. His most notable military victory was the Battle of Breitenfeld in 1631. With his resources, logistics, and support, Gustavus Adolphus was positioned to become a major European leader, but he was killed a year later at the Battle of Lützen. He was assisted in his efforts by Count Axel Oxenstierna, the Lord High Chancellor of Sweden, who also acted as regent after his death.

Coming to the throne at the age of 16, Gustavus Adolphus inherited three wars from his father Charles IX of Sweden; border conflicts with Russia and Denmark-Norway, and a dynastic struggle with his first cousin, King Sigismund III Vasa of Poland. Of these, the Danish war was the most serious. During his reign, Sweden rose from the status of a Baltic Sea basin regional power to one of the great powers of Europe and a model of early modern era government. Gustavus Adolphus is known as the "father of modern warfare", or the first modern general. He taught a number of other military commanders, such as Lennart Torstensson, who would go on to expand the boundaries and the power of Swedish Empire after Gustavus Adolphus's death. Spoils meant he became a successful bookraider in Europe, targeting Jesuit collections.

His contributions to Sweden's rise in power included reformation of the administrative structure. For example, he began Parish Registration of the population, so that the central government could more efficiently tax and conscript the people. He is also widely commemorated by Protestants in Europe as the main defender of their cause during the Thirty Years' War, with multiple churches, foundations and other undertakings named after him, including the Gustav-Adolf-Werk.

Biographical details

Gustavus Adolphus was born in Stockholm on 9 December 1594, eldest son of Duke Charles of the House of Vasa and his second wife, Christina of Holstein-Gottorp. At the time, his cousin Sigismund was both King of Sweden and Poland. The Protestant Duke Charles forced the Catholic Sigismund to abandon the throne of Sweden in 1599, part of the preliminary religious strife before the Thirty Years' War, and reigned as regent before taking the throne as Charles IX of Sweden in 1604. Crown Prince Gustav Adolph had Gagnef-Floda in Dalecarlia as a duchy from 1610. Upon his father's death in October 1611, a sixteen-year-old Gustavus inherited the throne, being declared of age and able to reign himself at seventeen as of 16 December. He also inherited an ongoing succession of occasionally belligerent dynastic disputes with his Polish cousin, Sigismund III, who persisted in his effort to regain the Swedish throne.

He intervened on behalf of the Lutherans in Germany, who opened the gates of their cities to him. His reign became known from his actions a few years later when, in June 1630, he landed in Germany, marking the Swedish intervention in the Thirty Years' War. Gustavus Adolphus intervened on the anti-Imperial side, which at the time was losing to the Holy Roman Empire and its Catholic allies; the Swedish forces would quickly reverse that situation.

Gustavus Adolphus was married to Maria Eleonora of Brandenburg, the daughter of John Sigismund, Elector of Brandenburg, and chose the Prussian city of Elbing as the base for his operations in Germany. He died in the Battle of Lützen in 1632. His death was a great loss to the Lutheran side, resulting in large parts of Germany and other countries, which had been conquered for Lutheranism, to be reconquered for Catholicism (via the Counter-Reformation). His involvement in the Thirty Years' War gave rise to the saying that he was the incarnation of "the Lion of the North" (German: "Der Löwe aus Mitternacht", lit. The Lion of Midnight).

Reputation

Historian Ronald S. Love wrote that in 1560–1660 there were "a few innovators, notably Maurice of Nassau and Gustavus Adolphus of Sweden, whom many scholars credit with revolutionary developments in warfare and with having laid the foundations of military practice for the next two centuries." Scholars consider him an extremely able military commander. His integration of infantry, cavalry, logistics, and particularly his use of artillery, earned him the title of the "Father of Modern Warfare".

Future commanders who studied and admired Gustavus Adolphus include Napoleon I of France and Carl von Clausewitz. His advancements in warfare made Sweden the dominant Baltic power for the next hundred years (see Swedish Empire). He is also the only Swedish monarch to be styled "the Great". This decision was made by the Swedish Estates of the Realm when they convened in 1633, making him officially called Gustavus Adolphus the Great (Gustavus Adolphus Magnus).

Gustavus Adolphus was the main figure responsible for the success of Swedish arms during the Thirty Years' War and led his nation to great prestige. As a general, Gustavus Adolphus employed mobile artillery on the battlefield, as well as very aggressive tactics, where attack was stressed over defense, and mobility and cavalry initiative were emphasized.

Among other innovations, he installed an early form of combined arms in his formations, where the cavalry could attack from the safety of an infantry line reinforced by cannon, and retire again within to regroup after their foray. Inspired by the reform of Maurice of Nassau, he adopted much shallower infantry formations than were common in the pike and shot armies of the era, with formations typically fighting in 5 or 6 ranks, occasionally supported at some distance by another such formation—the gaps being the provinces of the artillery and cavalry as noted above.

His artillery were themselves different—in addition to the usual complements of heavy cannon, he introduced light mobile guns for the first time into the Renaissance battlefield. These were grouped in batteries supporting his more linearly deployed formations, replacing the cumbersome and unmaneuverable traditional deep squares (such as the Spanish tercios that were up to 50 ranks deep) used in other pike and shot armies of the day. In consequence, his forces could redeploy and reconfigure very rapidly, confounding his enemies. He created the modern Swedish Navy, which transported troops and supplies to the Continental battlefront.

Carl von Clausewitz and Napoleon Bonaparte considered him one of the greatest generals of all time, an evaluation agreed with by George S. Patton and others. He was also renowned for his constancy of purpose and the equality of his troops—no one part of his armies was considered better or received preferred treatment, as was common in other armies where the cavalry were the elite, followed by the artillery, and both disdained the lowly infantry. In Gustavus Adolphus's' army the units were extensively cross-trained. Both cavalry and infantry could service the artillery, as his heavy cavalry did when turning captured artillery on the opposing Catholic tercios at First Breitenfeld.

Pikemen could shoot—if not as accurately as those designated musketeers—so a valuable firearm could be kept in the firing line. His infantrymen and gunners were taught to ride, if needed. Napoleon thought highly of the achievement and copied the tactics. However, recent historians have challenged his reputation. B. H. Liddell Hart says it is an exaggeration to credit him with a uniquely disciplined conscript army, or call his the first military state to fight a protracted war on the continent. He argues that he improved existing techniques and used them brilliantly. Richard Brzezinski says his legendary status was based on inaccurate myths created by later historians. Many of his innovations were developed by his senior staff.

Political philosophy

Gustavus Adolphus's politics in the conquered territory of Estonia also show progressive tendencies. In 1631 he forced the nobility to grant the peasants greater autonomy. He also encouraged education, opening a school in Tallinn in 1631, today known as Gustav Adolf Grammar School. On 30 June 1632, Gustavus Adolphus signed the Foundation Decree of Academia Dorpatensis in Estonia, today known as the University of Tartu.

Despite significant hardships for the common people, the period of Swedish rule over Estonia has been idealized in Estonian folklore as the "good old Swedish times" (Estonian: vana hea Rootsi aeg), which has been attributed to comparisons with the following era under the Russian Tsars.

On 27 August 1617, his speech before his coronation included the following statement:

I had carefully learned to understand, about that experience which I could have upon things of rule, how fortune is failing or great, subject to such rule in common, so that otherwise I would have had scant reason to desire such a rule, had I not found myself obliged to it through God’s bidding and nature. Now it was of my acquaintance, that inasmuch as God had let me be born a prince, such as I then am born, then my good and my destruction were knotted into one with the common good; for every reason then, it was now my promise that I should take great pains about their well-being and good governance and management, and thereabout bear close concern.

Military commander
Gustavus Adolphus inherited three wars from his father when he ascended the throne: against Denmark-Norway, which had attacked Sweden earlier in 1611; against Russia, due to Sweden having tried to take advantage of the Russian Time of Troubles; and against Poland-Lithuania, due to King Charles's having deposed King Sigismund III, his nephew, as King of Sweden.

The war against Denmark-Norway (Kalmar War) was concluded in 1613 with a peace that did not cost Sweden any territory, but it was forced to pay a heavy indemnity to Denmark-Norway (Treaty of Knäred). During this war, Gustavus Adolphus let his soldiers plunder towns and villages, and as he met little resistance from Danish forces in Scania, they pillaged and devastated twenty-four Scanian parishes. His memory in Scania has been negative because of that fear. The largest destroyed settlement was the Town Væ, which two years later was replaced by Danish-Norwegian King Christian IV as the nearby Christiansted (after the Swedification process, spelled Kristianstad), the last Scanian town to be founded by a Danish king.

The war against Russia (Ingrian War) ended in 1617 with the Treaty of Stolbovo, which excluded Russia from the Baltic Sea. The final inherited war, the war against Poland, ended in 1629 with the Truce of Altmark, which transferred the large province of Livonia to Sweden and freed the Swedish forces for the subsequent intervention in the Thirty Years' War in Germany, where Swedish forces had already established a bridgehead in 1628.

The electorate of Brandenburg was especially torn apart by a quarrel between the Protestant and Catholic parties. The Brandenburg minister and diplomat baron  influenced Gustavus Adolphus to support and protect the Protestant side in Germany. When Gustavus Adolphus began his push into northern Germany in June–July 1630, he had just 4,000 troops. He was soon able to consolidate the Protestant position in the north, however, using reinforcements from Sweden and money supplied by France at the Treaty of Bärwalde.

After Swedish plundering in Brandenburg (1631) endangered the system of retrieving war contributions from occupied territories, "marauding and plundering" by Swedish soldiers was prohibited. Meanwhile, a Catholic army under Johann Tserclaes, Count of Tilly was laying waste to Saxony. Gustavus Adolphus met Tilly's army and won a decisive victory at the First Battle of Breitenfeld in September 1631. He then marched across Germany, establishing his winter quarters near the Rhine, making plans for the invasion of the rest of the Holy Roman Empire.

In March 1632, Gustavus Adolphus invaded Bavaria, an ally of the Emperor. He forced the withdrawal of his Catholic opponents at the Battle of Rain, marking the high point of the campaign. In the summer of that year, he sought a political solution that would preserve the existing structure of states in Germany, while guaranteeing the security of its Protestants. But achieving these objectives depended on his continued success on the battlefield.

Gustavus Adolphus is reported to have entered battle without wearing any armor, proclaiming, "The Lord God is my armor!" However, it is more likely that he simply wore a padded cuirass rather than going into battle wearing no battle protection whatsoever. In 1627, near Dirschau in Prussia, a Polish soldier shot him in the muscles above his shoulders. He survived, but the doctors could not remove the bullet, so from that point on, he could not wear iron armor and two fingers of his right hand were paralyzed. The plate cuirass normally worn by important officers at that time was replaced by a buff coat made of moose hide, which would have serious consequences later.

Death and aftermath

On 6 November 1632, Gustavus encountered the Imperial Army under Albrecht von Wallenstein at Lützen. The subsequent battle was one of the most decisive battles of the Thirty Years' War. Gustavus was killed when, at a crucial point in the battle, he became separated from his troops while leading a cavalry charge on his wing. Lützen was a Protestant victory, but the Protestants lost one of its most important leaders, which caused the Protestant campaign to lose direction and suffer a crushing defeat at Nördlingen.

Towards 1:00 pm, in the thick mix of gun smoke and fog covering the field, the king was separated from his fellow riders and suffered multiple shots. A bullet crushed his left arm below the elbow. Almost simultaneously his horse suffered a shot to the neck that made it hard to control. In the mix of fog and smoke from the burning town of Lützen the king rode astray behind enemy lines. There he sustained yet another shot in the back, was stabbed and fell from his horse.

Lying on the ground, he received a final, fatal shot to the temple. His fate remained unknown for some time. However, when the gunnery paused and the smoke cleared, his horse was spotted between the two lines, Gustavus Adolphus himself not on it and nowhere to be seen. His disappearance stopped the initiative of the hitherto successful Swedish right wing, while a search was conducted. His partly stripped body was found an hour or two later, and evacuated from the field in a Swedish artillery wagon.

As late as the 19th century several stories were retold about Gustav Adolphus's death. In most of them the assassin was named as Prince , who was next to the king on the occasion and was thought to be acting on behalf of the enemy. When King Charles XII of Sweden was shown purported evidence in 1707 he dismissed the theory out of doubt that "any prince could be so ungrateful".

In February 1633, the Riksdag of the Estates gave him the title  "Gustavus Adolphus the Great", or Gustav Adolf den Store in Swedish, the only Swedish monarch to be so honoured. 

As those Vasa princes who descended from deposed monarchs were excluded from the throne and Gustavus Adolphus's younger brother had died ten years before, his young daughter Christina became his successor, with Maria Eleonora and other ministers governing on her behalf. He left one other known child, his illegitimate son Gustav, Count of Vasaborg.

Legacy

Gustavus Adolphus is widely commemorated by Protestants in Europe as the main defender of their cause during the Thirty Years' War, with multiple churches, foundations and other undertakings named after him. He became a symbol of Swedish pride, and his name is attached to city squares in major Swedish cities like Stockholm, Gothenburg and Helsingborg. Gustavus Adolphus Day is celebrated in Sweden and Finland each year on 6 November, the day the king died at Lützen. One of the traditions on this day is the Gustavus Adolphus pastry. In Finland, the day is also called "the Swedish day". Gustavus Adolphus College, a Lutheran college in St. Peter, Minnesota, is also named for him.

The Gustav-Adolf-Werk (GAW) of the Evangelical Church in Germany, founded on the bicentennial celebration of the Battle of Lützen, has as its object the aid of other churches and commemorates Gustavus' legacy. It is responsible for taking care of the Diaspora work of the EKD and has separate branches internationally. The organization in Austria is called the Gustav-Adolf-Verein. The project of forming such a society was first broached in connection with the bicentennial celebration of the Battle of Lützen on 6 November 1832.

A proposal to collect funds for a monument to Gustavus Adolphus was agreed to, and it was suggested by Superintendent Grossmann that the best memorial to Gustavus Adolphus would be the formation of a union for propagating his ideas. It quickly gained popularity in Germany. The lack of political correctness received some criticism; however, the organization used GAW as its brand in the meanwhile. The Swedish royal family visited the GAW headquarters in Leipzig on the 400th birthday of Gustavus Adolphus, in 1994.

Evaluations
The Columbia Encyclopedia sums up his record:
In military organization and strategy, Gustavus (sic) was ahead of his time. While most powers relied on mercenary troops, he organized a national standing army that distinguished itself by its discipline and relatively high moral standards. Deeply religious, the king desired his soldiers to behave like a truly Christian army; his stern measures against the common practices of looting, raping, and torture were effective until his death. His successes were due to this discipline, his use of small, mobile units, the superiority of his firearms, and his personal charisma. Although he was deeply interested in the internal progress of his kingdom, much of the credit for the development of Swedish industry and the fiscal and administrative reforms of his reign belongs to Oxenstierna.

The German Socialist Franz Mehring wrote a biography of Gustavus Adolphus with a Marxist perspective on the actions of the Swedish king during the Thirty Years' War. In it, he makes a case that the war was fought over economics and trade rather than religion. The Swedes discovered huge deposits of copper, which were used to build brass cannon. The cottage-industrial growth stimulated an armaments industry.

In his book "Ofredsår" ("Years of Warfare"), the Swedish historian and author Peter Englund argues that there was probably no single all-important reason for the king's decision to go to war. Instead, it was likely a combination of religious, security, as well as economic considerations. This view is supported by German historian Johannes Burkhardt, who writes that Gustavus entered the 30 Years War exactly 100 years after the publication of the Confessio Augustana, the core confession of faith of the Lutheran Church, and let himself be praised as its saviour. Yet Gustavus Adolphus's own "manifesto of war" does not mention any religious motivations at all but speaks of political and economic reasons.

Sweden would have to maintain its integrity in the face of several provocations and aggressions by the Habsburg Empire. The manifesto was written by scholar Johann Adler Salvius in a style common of the time that promotes a "just war". Burkhardt argues that traditional Swedish historiography constructed a defensive interest in security out of that by taking the manifesto's text for granted. But to defend Stockholm, the occupation of the German Baltic territories would have been an extreme advance and the imperial Baltic Sea fleet mentioned as a threat in the manifesto had never reached more than a quarter of the size of the Swedish fleet.

Moreover, it was never maintained to challenge Sweden but to face the separatist Netherlands. So if ruling the Baltic Sea was a goal of Swedish strategy, the conquests in Germany were not a defensive war but an act of expansion. From Swedish Finland, Gustavus Adolphus advanced along the Baltic Sea coast and eventually to Augsburg and Munich and he even urged the Swiss Confederacy to join him. This was no longer about Baltic interests but the imperial capital of Vienna and the alpine passes that were now in close reach of the Swedish army.

Burkhardt points out that the Gothic legacy of the Swedes, coalesced as a political program. The Swedish king was also "Rex Gotorum", and the list of kings was traced back to the Gothic rulers to construct continuity. Prior to his embarkment to northern Germany, Gustavus urged the Swedish nobility to follow the example of conquests set by their Gothic ancestors. Had he lived longer, it would have been likely that Gustavus had reached out for the imperial crown of the Holy Roman Empire.

Issue

Ancestry

Gallery

In music and fiction
The Swedish composer Franz Berwald composed the choral work Gustaf Adolph den stores seger och död vid Lützen (Gustav Adolf the Great's Victory and Death near Lützen) in 1845.  He is also the protagonist of Max Bruch’s 1898 choral work Gustav Adolf.

He is also a significant supporting character  in the best-selling alternate history book series, 1632, written by American historian, writer, and editor Eric Flint (first published in 2000).

The song The Lion From the North from the album Carulous Rex, released by Swedish Power Metal Band Sabaton is about Gustav II

See also
 Gustavus Adolphus Day
 History of Sweden
 Rise of Sweden as a Great Power
 Axel Oxenstierna
 Gustav of Vasaborg
 Gustavus Adolphus College
 Gustav Adolf Grammar School

Notes

References

Bibliography
 Ahnlund, Nils, Gustav Adolf the Great, trans. Michael Roberts., Princeton, 1940.
 Brzezinski, Richard, The Army of Gustavus Adolphus. (Osprey, 1993). . excerpt
 Brzezinski, Richard. Lützen 1632: Climax of the Thirty Years’ War (Praeger, 2005).
 Dupuy, Trevor Nevitt. The Military Life of Gustavus Adolphus: Father of Modern War (Franklin Watts, 1969).
 Earle, E.M. ed. Makers of Modern Strategy: Military Thought from Machiavelli to Hitler, 1948.
 
 
 
 Nordstrom, Byron J. "Gustavus II Adolphus (Sweden) (1594–1632; Ruled 1611–1632)" Encyclopedia of the Early Modern World: Europe, 1450 to 1789, 2004.
 
 Ringmar, Erik. Identity, Interest and Action: A Cultural Explanation of Sweden's Intervention in the Thirty Years' War. (Cambridge, 1996).
 Roberts, Michael. Gustavus Adolphus, A History of Sweden 1611–1632 (two volumes) (London: Longmans, Green, 1953–1958).
 
 Roberts, Michael. Gustavus Adolphus and the Rise of Sweden (London: English Universities Press, 1973).
 Roberts, Michael. The Military Revolution 1560–1660, (Belfast: M. Boyd, 1956).
 Roberts, Michael. Sweden as a great power 1611–1697 (London: St. Martin's Press, 1968)
 Schürger, André. The Battle of Lützen: an examination of 17th century military material culture (University of Glasgow 2015) .

Historiography
 Ekman, Ernst. "Three Decades of Research on Gustavus Adolphus" Journal of Modern History 38#3 (1966), pp. 243–255 DOI: 10.2307/1877349 online
 
 Murray, Jeremy. "The English-Language Military Historiography of Gustavus Adolphus in the Thirty Years’ War, 1900–Present," Western Illinois Historical Review (Spring 2013) vol 5. online
 Thomson, Erik. "Beyond the Military State: Sweden’s Great Power Period in Recent Historiography." History Compass 9.4 (2011): 269–283. online

External links
 
 
 
 The Great and Famous Battle of Lutzen..., transcription
 

1594 births
1632 deaths
17th-century Swedish monarchs
Burials at Riddarholmen Church
Candidates for the Polish elective throne
Crown Princes of Sweden
Dukes of Södermanland
 
House of Vasa
Male murder victims
Military history of Sweden
Monarchs killed in action
Knights of the Garter
Military personnel from Stockholm
People of the Kalmar War
Swedish Lutherans
Swedish people of the Thirty Years' War
Rulers of Finland
Sons of kings
Swedish military personnel killed in action
Military personnel of the Thirty Years' War